Y Wladfa ("The Colony"), also occasionally Y Wladychfa Gymreig ("The Welsh Settlement"), refers to the establishment of settlements by Welsh immigrants in Patagonia, beginning in 1865, mainly along the coast of the lower Chubut Valley. In 1881, the area became part of the Chubut National Territory of Argentina which, in 1955, became Chubut Province.
 
In the 19th and early 20th century the Argentine government encouraged emigration from Europe to populate Patagonia which, until the Conquest of the Desert began in the 1870s, was terra nullius, claimed but not controlled by Argentina until 1884.

Between 1856 and 1875, 34 settlements of immigrants of various nationalities were established in Santa Fe and Entre Ríos. In addition to the main colony in Chubut, a smaller colony was set up in Santa Fe by 44 Welsh people who left Chubut, and another group settled at Coronel Suárez in southern Buenos Aires Province.

The Welsh-Argentine community is centred on Gaiman, Trelew, and Trevelin. There are 70,000 Welsh-Patagonians. However,
Chubut estimates the number of Patagonian Welsh speakers to be about 1,500, while other estimates put the number at 5,000.

History

First settlers 1865

The idea of a Welsh colony in Patagonia was put forward by Michael D. Jones, a Welsh nationalist nonconformist preacher based in Bala, Gwynedd, who had called for a new "little Wales beyond Wales". He spent some years in the United States, where he observed that Welsh immigrants assimilated very quickly compared with other peoples and often lost much of their Welsh identity. Thus, the original proposal was to establish a new Wales overseas where Welsh settlers and their culture would be generally free from foreign domination. He proposed setting up a Welsh-speaking colony away from the influence of the English language. Patagonia, including the Chubut Valley, was claimed by Buenos Aires but it had little control over the area (which was also claimed by Chile). Jones had been corresponding with the Argentinean government about settling an area known as Bahía Blanca where Welsh immigrants could preserve their language and culture. The Argentinean government granted the request as it put them in control of a large tract of land. A Welsh immigration committee met in Liverpool and published a handbook, to publicize the scheme to form a Welsh colony in Patagonia which was distributed throughout Wales.

Towards the end of 1862, Captain Love Jones-Parry and Lewis Jones (after whom Trelew was named) left for Patagonia to decide whether it was a suitable area for Welsh emigrants. They first visited Buenos Aires where they held discussions with the Interior Minister Guillermo Rawson then, having come to an agreement, headed south. They reached Patagonia in a small ship named the Candelaria, and were driven by a storm into a bay which they named Porth Madryn, after Jones-Parry's estate in Wales. The town that grew near the spot where they landed is now named Puerto Madryn. On their return to Wales they declared the area to be very suitable for colonization.

On 28 July 1865, 153 Welsh settlers arrived aboard tea clipper Mimosa. The Mimosa settlers, including tailors, cobblers, carpenters, brickmakers, and miners, comprised 56 married adults, 33 single or widowed men, 12 single women (usually sisters or servants of married immigrants), and 52 children; the majority (92) were from the South Wales Coalfield and English urban centres. There were few farmers. This was rather unfortunate, particularly when they discovered that the attractions of the area had been oversold and they had landed in an arid semi-desert with little food; they had been told that the area was like lowland Wales. At the coast there was little drinking water, and the group embarked on a walk across the parched plain with a single wheelbarrow to carry their belongings. Some died and a baby, Mary Humphries, was born on the march. John Williams was the only colonist with any form of rudimentary medical skill. So disheartened were some settlers, they requested that the British Government settle them on the Falkland Islands. However, this request was ignored.

Once they reached the valley of the Chubut River, their first settlement was a small fortress on the site which later became the town of Rawson, now the capital of Chubut Province. The first houses, constructed from earth, were washed away by a flash flood in 1865, and new houses of superior quality were built to replace them. The floods also washed away crops of potatoes and maize. The rainfall in the area was much less than the colonists had been led to expect, leading to crop failures.

Consolidation 1866–1888 

The settlers first made contact with the local Tehuelche people almost a year after their arrival. After some difficult early years of suspicion and some violence, the Tehuelche people established cordial relationships with the Welsh and helped the settlement survive the early food shortages. By 1885, wheat production had reached 6,000 tons, with wheat produced by the colony winning the gold medal at international expositions at Paris and Chicago.

The mouth of the Chubut River was difficult to navigate, being shallow and with shifting sandbanks, and it was decided that a railway was required to connect the Lower Chubut valley to Puerto Madryn (originally Porth Madryn) on the Golfo Nuevo on the southern side of the Valdes Peninsula. Lewis Jones was the driving force, and in 1884 the Argentine Congress authorized the construction of the Central Chubut Railway by Lewis Jones y Cía. Raising funds for the project locally proved difficult, so Lewis Jones went to the United Kingdom to seek funds, where he enlisted the assistance of Asahel P. Bell, an engineer. Work on the railway began in 1886, helped by the arrival of another 465 Welsh settlers on the steamer Vesta. The town that grew at the railhead was named Trelew (Town of Llew) in honour of Lewis Jones. Initially the settlers were largely self-governing, with all men and women of 18 years of age or over having the right to vote.

In January 1868, the first newspaper of the colony,  (The Chronicle), appeared;  (Our Privilege) followed in 1878. Both were short-lived, only six issues of each title being circulated. Lewis Jones established  (The Discussion) in 1891, and this had greater longevity: a weekly issue was produced until 1961.

Expansion towards the Andes 1885–1902 

By the mid-1880s most of the good agricultural land in the Lower Chubut valley had been claimed, and the colonists mounted a number of expeditions to explore other parts of Patagonia to seek more cultivable land. In 1885, the Welsh asked the governor of Chubut Province, Luis Jorge Fontana, for permission to arrange an expedition to explore the Andean part of Chubut. Fontana decided to accompany the expedition in person. By the end of November 1885 they had reached a fertile area which the Welsh named  (Pleasant Valley). By 1888, this site at the foot of the Andes had become another Welsh settlement, named in Spanish . As the population grew here, the towns of Esquel and Trevelin were founded.

In 1893, a Welsh-language newspaper called Y Drafod (The Conversation) was founded by Lewis Jones to promote Welshness in Y Wladfa.

This area became the subject of the Cordillera of the Andes Boundary Case 1902 between Argentina and Chile. Initially the border was defined by a line connecting the highest peaks in the area, but it later became clear that this line was not the same as the line separating the watersheds, with some of the rivers in the area flowing westwards. Argentina and Chile agreed that the United Kingdom should act as arbitrator, and the views of the Welsh settlers were canvassed. In 1902, despite an offer of a league of land per family from Chile, they voted to remain in Argentina.

Setbacks in the Lower Chubut Valley 1899–1915 

Serious damage was caused by floods in the 1890s and 1900s, which devastated Rawson and to a lesser extent Gaiman, though Trelew was not affected. There was also disagreement between the settlers and the government of Argentina, which introduced conscription and insisted on males of military age drilling on Sundays. This ran counter to the Sabbatarian principles of the settlers and caused much ill-feeling, though the matter was eventually resolved by the intervention of the president of Argentina, Julio Argentino Roca. These factors, and a lack of unclaimed farmable land, caused 234 people to leave for Liverpool aboard the Orissa on 14 May 1902, with 208 of them subsequently travelling to Canada, arriving at Saltcoats, Saskatchewan, in late June, although some of these families later returned to Chubut and  later migrated to Australia. Some other settlers moved to Río Negro Province in Argentina. Many of those who left Chubut were late arrivals who had failed to obtain land of their own, and they were replaced by more immigrants from Wales. By the end of the 19th century there were some 4,000 people of Welsh descent living in Chubut. The last substantial migration from Wales took place shortly before World War I, which put a halt to further immigration. Approximately 1,000 Welsh immigrants arrived in Patagonia between 1886 and 1911; on the basis of this and other statistics, Glyn Williams estimated that perhaps no more than 2,300 Welsh people ever migrated directly to Patagonia.

Later development

Immigration to the area after 1914 was mainly from Italy and other southern European countries. Welsh became a minority language. The Society traded on the settlers' behalf in Buenos Aires and acted as a bank with 14 branches. The cooperative society collapsed in the Great Depression of the 1930s.

The Welsh have left their mark on the landscape, with windmills and chapels across the province, including the distinctive wood and corrugated zinc Capel Salem and Trelew's Salon San David. Many settlements along the valley bear Welsh names.

During the British Government's repatriation of the 11,313 Argentine POWs taken during the 1982 Falklands War, Welsh-speaking British merchant seamen and British soldiers from the Welsh Guards were shocked to find themselves addressed in Patagonian Welsh by an Argentine POW who was on the way home to Puerto Madryn. Over the years since, close ties between Wales and Y Wladfa have been reestablished.

A 2001 BBC article described in detail the recent visit to Chubut Province by Archdruid  and 30 members of the Gorsedd Cymru in order to revive the Gorsedd Y Wladfa in a ceremony held in a specially constructed stone circle near Gaiman.

Every year, the Eisteddfod festival takes place in the town of Trevelin. BBC reporters attended the 2001 Eisteddfod del Chubut at Trelew and watched as the Bardic Chair was awarded for the first time in Y Wladfa to a female poet: Gaiman hotel owner Monica Jones de Jones, for an Awdl on the subject of Rhyddid ("Freedom"). The article's author continued, "The Patagonia Eisteddfod itself, while sharing those elements common to Eisteddfodau in Wales itself, nonetheless is, in other respects, quite a different affair. As well as haunting Welsh folk tunes, and recitations in the unique Spanish-accented Welsh of the Patagonians, there are also rousing displays of Argentinian folk dancing which owe everything to the culture of the gauchos and nothing to the somewhat tamer dance routines of the Welsh homeland."

Current Eisteddfod competitions are bilingual, in both Patagonian Welsh and Argentine Spanish, and include poetry, prose, literary translations (Welsh, Spanish, English, Italian, and French), musical performances, arts, folk dances, photography, and filmmaking among others. The Eisteddfod del Juventud is held every September at Gaiman. The main Eisteddfod del Chubut is held every October at Trelew. Other annual eisteddfodau are held at Trevelin, in the Andes and at Puerto Madryn along the South Atlantic coast.

In 2006, the first of a two-Test tour to Argentina by the Wales national rugby union team was played in Puerto Madryn, which was a 27–25 win for Argentina.

As of 2019, 1,411 people undertook Welsh courses in the region, which is the highest number on record for the project. There are three bilingual Welsh/Spanish primary schools in the province of Chubut, namely Ysgol yr Hendre in Trelew, Ysgol Gymraeg y Gaiman in Gaiman, and Ysgol Y Cwm in Trevelin.

In 2014, Professor Wyn James of Cardiff University estimated there were about 5,000 people in Patagonia who speak Welsh.

On 28 July 2015, celebrations took place to celebrate the 150th anniversary of the Welsh migrations. The First Minister of Wales,
Carwyn Jones, attended the celebration.

In October 2018, the BBC National Orchestra of Wales undertook an historic visit to Y Wladfa to give two concerts in a newly refurbished concert hall, that had previously been a wool factory on the outskirts of Trelew. These performances attracted thousands of local visitors and helped celebrate the 150th anniversary of the Welsh migration. Welsh harpist Catrin Finch and conductor Grant Llewelyn were part of the concerts.

Welsh language names for Argentine places

Map

Anthem 

Y Wladfa's anthem is a re-working of the Welsh anthem, "", called "" ('"The New Country of the Welsh"'). The new anthem was penned by Lewis Evans and is sung to the same tune as "".

Popular culture
Patagonia is a film about the Welsh settlement in Argentina.

In the BBC's 2015 Patagonia with Huw Edwards, Huw Edwards fulfils a lifelong dream to explore Patagonia, and the unique attempt to preserve Welsh culture by isolating a Welsh community there. Edwards meets the descendants of the original settlers and asks what remains of the culture their ancestors sought to safeguard.

See also 

 Eluned Morgan (author)
 Irish Argentine
 Richard Bryn Williams
 Conquest of the Desert
 Scottish Argentine
 Chilean colonization of the Strait of Magellan
 Spanish colonization attempt of the Strait of Magellan
 Thomas Benbow Phillips
 Welsh settlement in the Americas
 Welsh Tract
 A Swiftly Tilting Planet
 Patagonia (film)

Notes

References 
Western Mail (Cardiff, Wales). 27 Dec 2004. Patagonia Welsh to watch S4C shows.

Walter Ariel Brooks, 'Welsh print culture in y Wladfa: The role of ethnic newspapers in Welsh Patagonia, 1868-1933' (Cardiff University PhD thesis, 2012) - https://orca.cf.ac.uk/46450/1/WelshPrintCultureInYWladfaWalterBrooks.pdf
E. Wyn James, ‘Identity, Immigration, and Assimilation: The Case of the Welsh Settlement in Patagonia’, Transactions of the Honourable Society of Cymmrodorion, 24 (2018), 76–87. ISSN 0959-3632.

External links 

 Project-Hiraeth – Documents the stories of the Welsh colony in Patagonia, Argentina through film, text and illustration.
 Glaniad – A website that tells the story of the Welsh settlements in Patagonia 
 Y Wladfa — The Welsh in Patagonia on h2g2
 BBC Wales History on the Welsh migration to Patagonia
 Andes Celtig A trilingual website with information, maps and photographs of the Welsh settlements in Patagonia
 Teithiau Tango A bilingual website with in-depth history of the Welsh Patagonia region.
 A Place of Meadows and Tall Trees: a novel based on the early years of the Patagonian settlement by Clare Dudman.
 BBC News: Viewpoint – The Argentines who speak Welsh
 Patagonian Welsh national anthem discovered in 19th century pamphlet
 Videos of papers at a conference on Wales and the Welsh Settlement in Patagonia held at Aberystwyth University, 6 June 2015.Cynhadledd Patagonia/Patagonia Conference 
 Videos of papers at a conference on Wales and the Welsh Settlement in Patagonia held at Cardiff University, 6–7 July 2015.
 Y Wladfa Gymreig ym Mhatagonia – YouTube

19th-century colonization of the Americas
 
British Argentine
Chubut Province
European colonization of South America
Immigration to Argentina
Welsh culture
Welsh emigration